LAAA may refer to:
 Haiti in Action, a political party 
 L-proline amide hydrolase, an enzyme
 Los Angeles Angels of Anaheim